Douglas Mason Fisher (September 19, 1919 – September 18, 2009) was a Canadian political columnist and politician.

Life and career
The long-time dean of the Parliamentary press gallery in Ottawa, Fisher was born in Sioux Lookout, Ontario, the son of Roy W. Fisher and Eva Pearl Mason, and worked at various jobs, including as a miner, before enlisted in the Canadian Army's 12th Armoured Car Regiment of the 12th Manitoba Dragoons during World War II. He landed at Normandy following D-Day and fought through northwestern Europe until reaching Germany. Returning to Canada after the war, he enrolled at the University of Toronto through a veteran's program and, after graduating, returned to northern Ontario to teach history at Port Arthur Collegiate Institute. In 1948, Fisher married Barbara Elizabeth Lamont; the two later divorced. He entered politics with his upset victory in the 1957 general election as a candidate for the Co-operative Commonwealth Federation (CCF). He won over Liberal Cabinet minister C.D. Howe, the "minister of everything" in the governments of William Lyon Mackenzie King and Louis St. Laurent.

As CCF Member of Parliament (MP) for Port Arthur, Ontario, Fisher was an active member of the House during the 1957-1958 minority government. He quickly became knowledgeable both of parliamentary rules and personalities.

Re-elected in 1958 with an increased majority, Fisher was one of only a handful of CCFers elected in the general election that returned a crushing Progressive Conservative majority government, led by John Diefenbaker. The CCF, nearly wiped out, began to debate a relaunch of the social democratic movement in Canada by formally integrating the party with the Canadian Labour Congress trade union movement. Fisher, along with the interim leader of the CCF, Hazen Argue, resisted the transition into what was to become the New Democratic Party, arguing against making labour too strong within the movement. Fisher ran for president of the CCF in a bid to unseat David Lewis, who was one of the architects of the New Party proposal, but was soundly defeated.

When the new party became a fait accompli, Fisher supported Argue in his bid to lead the NDP. Argue lost, and crossed the floor to the Liberals. Fisher remained in the party and became an NDP MP, although he increasingly found himself at odds with the rest of the NDP caucus, and saw himself on the right-wing of the party.

Economic pressures also ensued as MPs were not well-paid at the time, and Fisher needed to support a growing family. Offered a job by Toronto Telegram publisher John Bassett, he began freelancing as a political columnist.

After the 1963 election saw the defeat of David Lewis, who had been Deputy Leader of the New Democratic Party, Doug Fisher became Deputy Leader.

Finding journalism more rewarding than politics, Fisher retired from the House of Commons at the 1965 general election after eight years as an MP. He remained on Parliament Hill as a full-time parliamentary columnist.  In the 1968 general election, Fisher reconciled with the NDP, and attempted a political comeback as the party's candidate in the suburban Toronto riding of York Centre, but came in second to the Liberal candidate.

When the Telegram folded in 1971, Fisher joined the upstart Toronto Sun as its Ottawa columnist. He remained a columnist for the Sun chain of newspapers until his retirement in 2006. With almost a half-century of his life spent in and covering Parliament, Fisher was considered the most experienced political writer in Canada. He had five sons: Matthew, Mark, Luke, John and Tobias. Matthew Fisher was a foreign correspondent for the National Post. Fisher also worked for more than 30 years as host of a Sunday night TV show, Insight, on Ottawa's CJOH-TV and made regular appearances on CTV’s Question Period.

From 1974 to 1977, Fisher was head of Hockey Canada.

Fisher was the recipient of the 2001 Distinguished Service Award of the Canadian Association of Former Parliamentarians, "presented annually to a former parliamentarian who has made an outstanding contribution to the country and its democratic institutions."

Fisher retired at the age of 86, due to declining health. His last column appeared on July 30, 2006. He died on September 18, 2009, only one day shy of his 90th birthday.

References

External links
 
 
 
 

1919 births
2009 deaths
Canadian columnists
Canadian political journalists
Canadian sportsperson-politicians
Co-operative Commonwealth Federation MPs
20th-century Canadian politicians
Members of the House of Commons of Canada from Ontario
New Democratic Party MPs
People from Sioux Lookout
Politicians from Thunder Bay
Canadian Unitarians
Toronto Sun people